Temesvári is a Hungarian surname. Temesvár is a Hungarian name of Timișoara. Notable people with the surname include:

 Andrea Temesvári (born 1966), Hungarian tennis player
 Anna Temesvári (born 1943), Hungarian swimmer
 Ferenc Temesvári (1916–?), Hungarian middle distance
 Miklós Temesvári (born 1938), Hungarian football player and manager
 Ottó Temesvári (born 1934), Hungarian basketball player

Hungarian-language surnames